I Still Know What You Did Last Summer is a 1998 slasher film directed by Danny Cannon and written by Trey Callaway. Jennifer Love Hewitt, Freddie Prinze Jr. and Muse Watson reprise their roles, with Brandy, Mekhi Phifer and Matthew Settle joining the cast. It is the second installment in the I Know What You Did Last Summer franchise. The film takes place one year after the events of I Know What You Did Last Summer. It received negative reviews and grossed $40 million on a budget of $24–65 million. A direct-to-video sequel, I'll Always Know What You Did Last Summer, was released in 2006. The movie was filmed in California and Jalisco, Mexico.

Plot
One year after the brutal murders of her friends Helen Shivers and Barry Cox by the vengeful fisherman Ben Willis, Julie James is attending summer classes in Boston, but suffers from nightmares of the murders. Julie's roommate, Karla Wilson, receives a phone call from a local radio station and wins a vacation for four to The Bahamas. Julie invites her boyfriend, Ray Bronson, who declines, but later changes his mind. That evening, Ray and his co-worker, Dave, drive to Boston to surprise Julie, but stop due to a body in the middle of the road. When Ray discovers the body is a mannequin, Ben appears and kills Dave with his hook, then chases Ray in a truck, but Ray escapes and falls down a hill.

The next morning, Julie, Karla, Karla's boyfriend, Tyrell Martin, and their friend, Will Benson, depart for the trip. The group arrives at the hotel in Tower Bay and checks in. That evening at the hotel's bar, Julie is singing karaoke when the words "I still know what you did last summer" roll onto the screen. Terrified, she runs back to her room. At the dock, Darick, the dockhand, is tying up the boat. He is killed by Ben. Olga, the housekeeper, finds bloody sheets while working and is then killed by Ben. While the others get into the hot tub, Julie is in her room and notices that her toothbrush is missing. She searches her room before finding Darick dead in the closet. She finds her friends and they return to find no sign of Darick's body; Mr. Brooks, the hotel manager, refuses to believe her story. By the pool, Titus Telesco is murdered. Ray, who has survived his injuries, heads out to rescue Julie.

The next day, the group finds Olga, Titus, and Mr. Brooks murdered and the two-way radio, their only way of contact, destroyed. Isolated, the group goes to the room of Estes, the boat hand porter, and finds that he has been using voodoo against them. Estes appears, explaining he was trying to protect them after realizing that their answer to the radio station's question was incorrect. He tells them that Ben and his wife, Sarah, had two children: a son and a daughter. Ben murdered Sarah when he found out about an affair. Estes goes missing and Will volunteers to find him, while Ray takes a boat to the island. Julie, Karla, and Tyrell return to the hotel and find Nancy, the bartender, hiding in the kitchen.

Ben appears in the kitchen and kills Tyrell. The girls retreat to the attic, where Karla is attacked by Ben. Julie and Nancy rescue Karla and run to the storm cellar, where they find Ben's victims. Will bursts in and takes the girls back to the hotel, stating that he saw Ben on the beach. At the hotel, Will tells them that Estes attacked him and he is bleeding from the stomach. Nancy and Karla leave to find a first aid kit, but find Estes impaled with a harpoon. Ben appears, kills Nancy and attacks Karla. While Julie tends to Will, he reveals that it is not his blood and asks Julie what her favorite radio station is, revealing that he was the radio host and had killed Estes.

Will drags Julie to a graveyard, where he reveals that he is Ben's son. Ben appears and attacks Julie before Ray arrives and engages in a fight with Will. When Ben tries to stab Ray, he accidentally kills Will instead. While Ben is distraught from killing his son, Julie shoots him dead. Back at the hotel, Karla is found alive and they are rescued by the coast guard.

Sometime later, Ray and Julie get married and buy a home. Ray is brushing his teeth and the bathroom door is locked while he is occupied. Julie sits down on the bed and looks in the mirror, seeing Ben underneath. She screams as Ben pulls her under the bed, which ends the movie, thus leaving the audience questioning if the attack was real or just another of Julie's nightmares.

Cast

 Jennifer Love Hewitt as Julie James
 Freddie Prinze Jr. as Ray Bronson
 Brandy as Karla Wilson
 Mekhi Phifer as Tyrell Martin
 Matthew Settle as Will Benson/Willis
 Jennifer Esposito as Nancy
 Muse Watson as Ben Willis / The Fisherman
 Bill Cobbs as Estes
 Jeffrey Combs as Mr. Brooks
 Benjamin Brown as Darick the Dockhand
 Ellerine Harding as Olga 
 John Hawkes as Dave 
 Sarah Michelle Gellar as Helen Shivers (uncredited) (photo)
 Jack Black as Titus Telesco (uncredited)

Production
In 1997, director Mike Mendez pitched a sequel to I Know What You Did Last Summer that would have brought back Jennifer Love Hewitt and Freddie Prinze, Jr. in a college setting. In February 1998, Danny Cannon was announced as director, unrelated to Mendez's idea.
Matthew Settle, Hewitt and Prinze Jr. joined the cast March 1998, and Jennifer Esposito joined a month later.

Music

 "Sugar Is Sweeter" (CJ Bolland; Danny Saber remix featuring Justin Warfield) – 4:57
 "How Do I Deal" (Jennifer Love Hewitt) – 3:23
 "Relax" (Deetah) – 3:51
 "Hey Now Now" (Swirl 360) – 4:37
 "Blue Monday" (Orgy) – 4:32
 "Polite" (Bijou Phillips) – 4:25
 "Try to Say Goodbye" (Jory Eve) – 3:35
 "Testimony" (Grant Lee Buffalo) – 3:59
 "(Do You) Wanna Ride" (Reel Tight) – 3:33
 "Getting Scared" (Imogen Heap) – 4:51
 "Górecki" (Lamb) – 6:22
 "Julie's Theme" (John Frizzell) – 2:52
 "That Girl" (Esthero) - 4:41

The soundtrack was released on November 17, 1998 by Warner Bros. Records. On January 19, 1999, "How Do I Deal" was released as a single, backed by Jory Eve's "Try to Say Goodbye". A music video for "How Do I Deal" was made available to music television networks.
 The song "Eden" by Belgian rock/pop group Hooverphonic was also featured in the film, but did not appear on the final soundtrack. The song appeared early in the film, when Julie looked at the picture of Helen beside her bed.

Reception

Box office
The film made $16.5 million from 2,443 theaters during its opening weekend, finishing second behind holdover The Waterboy. At the end of its 15-week run, the film grossed $40 million in the United States.

Critical response
On review aggregator website Rotten Tomatoes the film holds an approval rating of 7% based on 57 reviews and an average rating of 3.4/10. The site's critical consensus reads, "Boring, predictable and bereft of thrills or chills, I Still Know What You Did Last Summer is exactly the kind of rehash that gives horror sequels a bad name." On Metacritic the film has a weighted average score of 21 out of 100, based on 19 critics, indicating "generally unfavorable reviews." Audiences polled by CinemaScore gave the film an average grade of "B" on an A+ to F scale.

Leonard Klady of Variety said: "Purists will find the pic's obviousness disappointing, but there's no question that the film delivers a sufficient shock quotient to satisfy its youthful target audience."

I Know What You Did Last Summers director, Jim Gillespie, said: "I thought it wasn't the right story. I didn't like the premise. It kind of killed the franchise a little bit. They had a chance to do something a bit different and for me it didn't work.“

Sequels 

On August 15, 2006, a straight-to-DVD film titled I'll Always Know What You Did Last Summer was released. The film is unrelated to the two previous films and features no returning cast members. It was originally proposed to continue where I Still Know What You Did Last Summer left off. Instead, the film features an unrelated plot with a brief mention of the first two films.

In February 2023, a new legacy sequel was announced as in development. Hewitt and Prinze Jr. are both in-talks to star.  Jennifer Kaytin Robinson will direct the film from a script by Leah McKendrick.

Other media

Book
In 1998, a paperback version of the screenplay for I Still Know What You Did Last Summer was published by Pocket Books.

References

External links

1998 films
Films about teenagers
Films based on urban legends
Films directed by Danny Cannon
Films set in 1998
Films set in the Bahamas
Films set in Boston
Films set in hotels
Films set on islands
Films scored by John Frizzell (composer)
American sequel films
American teen horror films
American horror thriller films
American slasher films
Mexican slasher films
Mexican horror films
Mexican thriller films
German slasher films
German horror films
Columbia Pictures films
Mandalay Pictures films
Original Film films
1998 horror films
Holiday horror films
1990s slasher films
1990s teen horror films
American films about revenge
Filicide in fiction
Independence Day (United States) films
I Know What You Did Last Summer (franchise)
Films about father–son relationships
1990s English-language films
1990s American films